The 2023 North Dakota State Bison softball team is an American college softball team that represents North Dakota State University during the 2023 NCAA Division I softball season. The Bison are led by Darren Mueller in his twenty-second season, and play their home games at Tharaldson Park. They compete in the Summit League.

Previous Season
The Bison finished the 2022 season with a 30-23 record, and a 10-8 record in Summit League play. NDSU played in the Summit League tournament as the 3rd seed. They defeated North Dakota and Omaha, before falling to South Dakota State and then Omaha in the elimination game to end their season in the semifinals.

Personnel

Roster

Coaching staff

Schedule

References

North Dakota State Bison softball
2023 in sports in North Dakota